Raymariely Santos Pérez (born April 13, 1992  is a Puerto Rican female volleyball player. She is part of the Puerto Rico women's national volleyball team.

She participated in the 2010 FIVB Volleyball World Grand Prix.
 and in the 2014 FIVB Volleyball World Grand Prix. On club level she has played for Puerto Rico, Spain and Kazakhstan.

In late 2017, she required surgery for an injury to a torn ligament in her finger.

References

External links
 FIVB Profile

1992 births
Living people
Puerto Rican women's volleyball players
Sportspeople from Ponce, Puerto Rico
Setters (volleyball)
Arkansas Razorbacks women's volleyball players